Mitchell Block (born c. 1950) is an American filmmaker, primarily a producer of documentary films.

He was executive producer of the 2000 short documentary film Big Mama, which won Best Documentary (Short Subject) at the 73rd Academy Awards. He produced the 2010 film Poster Girl, which was nominated in the same category at the 83rd Academy Awards. He also produced The Testimony (2015) and executive produced Women of the Gulag (2018), which were shortlisted in the Best Documentary (Short Subject) category at the 88th Academy Awards and the 91st Academy Awards, respectively. In 2022, Block, among Anna Rezan, Kim Magnusson and Zafeiris Haitidis produced the feature documentary My People that premiered to rave reviews in Los Angeles.

Early life and education
Block was born about 1950. He attended the Hun School of Princeton, graduating in 1968. He earned bachelor's and master's degrees in fine arts from the Tisch School of the Arts at New York University, where he majored in television and film production. In 1973, Block received the first Leo Jaffe Scholarship because of his student work as a producer. He earned an MBA from the Columbia Business School. He was a producing fellow at the American Film Institute  Center for Advanced Studies, Beverly Hills and did work towards a doctorate at UCLA in film and television history, criticism, theory and business.

Career
Block began to work in television and film. He became particularly interested in documentaries. He established his own company, Direct Cinema, in 1974, of which he is president. It produces and distributes films.

Since 1980, Block has been on the 40-person Documentary Screening Committee of the Academy Awards. They nominate the short list of finalists for awards.
In 2022, Block, among Anna Rezan, Kim Magnusson and Zafeiris Haitidis produced the feature documentary My People that premiered to rave reviews in Los Angeles.

Conflict of interest claims
In 1990, a group of 45 filmmakers filed a protest to the Academy of Motion Picture Arts and Sciences over a potential conflict of interest involving Block. They noted that Block was a member of the Documentary Steering Committee, which selects films as nominees, but he had a conflict of interest because his company Direct Cinema owned the distribution rights to three of the five films (including eventual winner Common Threads: Stories from the Quilt) selected that year as nominees for an Academy Award for Best Documentary Feature. They noted that Michael Moore's Roger & Me (distributed by Warner Brothers) was omitted from the nominees, although it had been highly praised by numerous critics and was ranked by many critics as one of the top ten films of the year.

Works
Block produced the documentary The Testimony (2015), which chronicled the 2014 Minova Trial in the Democratic Republic of Congo. It was short listed for a 2015 Academy Award. His 2010 film Poster Girl was also nominated for Academy Award for Best Documentary (Short Subject). He was executive producer for the film Big Mama (2000), which won an Academy Award for a documentary short.

Among the films and documentary series that Block has conceived, created and produced are Carrier and Another Day in Paradise, both of which were broadcast on the Public Broadcasting Service and the National Geographic Channel internationally. Carrier received an Emmy Award in 2009 for Best Cinematography in a prime time series.

In 2008, Block's short film No Lies (1973) was selected for the National Film Registry by the Librarian of Congress. In 2016, film critics for the website IndieWire selected No Lies as one of the ten best short films ever made.

In 2022, Block, among Anna Rezan, Kim Magnusson and Zafeiris Haitidis produced the feature documentary My People that premiered to rave reviews in Los Angeles.
A segment of the film titled My People: Jews of Greece had ran for the Oscars in 2021.

Personal life
Since 1978, Block has been an adjunct professor at the School of Cinematic Arts of the University of Southern California. He teaches in the Peter Stark Producing Program.

His moving image collection, the Direct Cinema/Mitchell Block Collection, is held at the Academy Film Archive.

References 

1950s births
Living people
American documentary filmmakers
Columbia Business School alumni
Hun School of Princeton alumni
Tisch School of the Arts alumni